The 2009–2010 Baltic League (known as the Triobet Baltic League for sponsorship reasons) is a 16-team football tournament held in the Baltic states. Five top teams from each participating country – Estonia, Latvia, and Lithuania – along with the winner of the 2008 season will play a 4 round and 2 legged (excluding final) play-off style knockout tournament. It is held from Autumn 2009 through Summer 2010.

Teams
 Meistriliiga – Levadia (1st), Flora (2nd), Trans (3rd), Kalju (4th),  Sillamäe Kalev (5th)
Although TVMK initially finished 3rd, they were demoted to 10th place at the end of the season due to severe financial difficulties. The team was later disbanded.
 Virslīga – Ventspils (1st), Metalurgs (2nd), Skonto (3rd), Dinaburg (4th), Jūrmala (7th)
Daugava Daugavpils (5th) merged with Dinaburg FC, with Dinaburg retaining its name. After FK Rīga (6th) went bankrupt Jūrmala were given the freed spot as the next best placed team.
 A Lyga – Ekranas (1st), Vėtra (3rd), Sūduva (4th), Šiauliai (7th), Tauras (1st I Lyga), Banga (3rd I Lyga)
FBK Kaunas (2nd) and FK Atlantas (6th) withdrew from the top league, citing serious differences with the Lithuanian Football Federation. FK Žalgiris (5th) were denied A Lyga license and were demoted to I Lyga. FK Šilutė (8th) were relegated to I Lyga because of their league position. Eventually two I Lyga sides, Tauras and Banga, were awarded the two remaining spots, as they were both promoted to the A Lyga.

Play-off Table

Round of 16

The second leg match was scratched and Vėtra advanced to the next round as Dinaburg was ejected from the competition for match-fixing.

Metalurgs advanced to the next round 6–2 on aggregate.

Sūduva advanced to the next round 3–1 on aggregate.

Ekranas advanced to the next round 3–2 on aggregate.

Levadia advanced to the next round 3–1 on aggregate.

Skonto advanced to the next round 4–1 on aggregate.

Flora advanced to the next round 4–2 on aggregate.

Ventspils advanced to the next round 2–1 on aggregate.

Quarter-finals

Ventspils advanced to the next round 3–1 on aggregate.

Flora advanced to the next round 2–1 on aggregate.

Sūduva advanced to the next round 1–0 on aggregate.

Metalurgs advanced to the next round 2–0 on aggregate.

Semi-finals

Ventspils advanced to the next round 2–0 on aggregate.

Sūduva advanced to the next round 4–2 on aggregate.

Final

Goalscorers
As of 4 July 2010.

4 goals:
  Vjatšeslav Zahovaiko

3 goals:

  Viktors Dobrecovs
  Povilas Lukšys
  Ričardas Beniušis

2 goals:

  Andrius Urbšys
  Dominykas Galkevičius
  Oskars Kļava
  Sergey Shumilin

1 goal:

  Andrey Agafonov
  Aleksandrs Cauņa
  Karolis Chvedukas
  Alexandru Dedov
  Israel Awenayeri Douglas
  Vytautas Dragūnevičius
  Alo Dupikov
  Aleksandrs Fertovs
  Antons Jemeļins
  Nathan Júnior
  Gatis Kalniņš
  Jurģis Kalns
  Vladimirs Kamešs
  Vitalijus Kavaliauskas
  Mantas Kuklys
  Vitali Leitan
  Deniss Malov
  João Martins
  Valeri Minkenen
  Konstantin Nahk
  Aleksey Naumov
  Felipe Nunes
  Ramūnas Radavičius
  Nerijus Radžius
  Deniss Rakels
  Vīts Rimkus
  Ivan Shpakov
  Maksim Smirnov
  Genādijs Soloņicins
  Aleksandrs Solovjovs
  Tadas Špukas
  Aleksandr Tarassenkov
  Michael Tukura
  Egidijus Varnas
  Aleksejs Višņakovs
  Eduards Višņakovs
  Jurijs Žigajevs
  Artūras Žulpa

References

External links
 Official website

20098
2009 in Estonian football
2009 in Latvian football
2009 in Lithuanian football
2010 in Estonian football
2010 in Latvian football
2010 in Lithuanian football
International club association football competitions hosted by Lithuania